Kiga people, or Abakiga ("people of the mountains"), are a Bantu ethnic group native to south western Uganda and northern Rwanda.

History

Pre-colonial period

The Kiga people are believed to have originated in Rwanda as mentioned in one of their folk songs - Abakiga twena tukaruga Rwanda, omu Byumba na Ruhenjere - meaning that all of us Bakiga, we came from Rwanda in Byumba and Ruhenjere (called Ruhengeri in Rwanda). Both Byumba and Ruhengeri are Rwandan cities. The Bakiga are believed to be the descendants of Kashyiga, who came to be called Kakiga son of Mbogo from the small Kingdom of Bumbogo in Rwanda later.  He came to form the present community of the Bakiga of Kigyezi or Kigezi as a result of immigration.

Before 1700 A.D., Rwanda is believed to have been occupied by the Twa people, and was later on occupied by the second immigration of the Hutu people, and the third was the Tutsi. Rwanda was organised in small states and chiefdoms but under one ruler called the Mwami. Originally, he was also known as Omukama. Among the Bakiga, the ruling person was therefore named Mukama, equivalent to Mwami in other parts of Rwanda.

Originally, the name Mukama was not a name, but rather the title of a Ruler. But later on it came to be recognised as a name, implying to one ruling man. In the Bakiga culture, the name was later attributed to GOD as LORD. Among the Bakiga, the name Mukama is not a female name. There are not many Bakiga called by the name Mukama. It is a name that was reserved to be used in the family of the ruling clan, the Bamuhutu, who possess the inheritance powers. If there is any person bearing the name Mukama, he must be a Bamuhutu, specifically a Mungura/Mwitira, or belong to the royal clan of the Bamuhutu. Not even in Rwanda among the Tutsi who took over the Kingdom after Mbogo had been defeated, did they dare to use the name Mukama because it signified a more fundamental power than they had assumed. Similar names could be like Byamukama, Kyomukama, Womukama, Kamukama, Bainomukama and so on. Therefore, the title for the King in Rwanda remained Mwami (Omwami), whereas in the Rukiga (the Kiga Kingdom) they continued to use the title Mukama (Omukama).

In the first stages of the formation of the Kingdom of Rwanda, the major states were Bumbogo, Buriza, and Rukoma. (These areas kept their names, and are located in central Rwanda near the capital city of Kigali). Each of these states was represented by a clan chief. The first Mwami was Mbogo of the small state of Bumbogo. At that time, the Hutu, Tutsi, and Twa ethnic groups were all present in Rwanda, living side by side. Though these three major groups stood out, their indigenous clans remained as the point of reference due to their totems. Mbogo, who belonged to the Abungura clan, today known as Abahitira clan, is believed to have been conquered by his friend Kirima (Cyirima) of the Abanyiginya clan. Kirima accused Mbogo of mistreating the people, and Kirima promised he would be a better chief, though he could not claim to be a King or Umwami. Kirima is believed to have made progress, but his time was short lived by the first invasion of Bunyoro, led by Cwa I son of Nyabwongo. (It remains to verify, whether Nyabwongo is same as Labongo, the first Babiito king of the Bunyoro-Kitara Kingdom in Uganda.)
 
Until now, Mbogo, the King, is not identified with any tribe, but rather with the clan of the Abahitira (Abungura). He was very old and did not want to fight Kirima. His son Kashyiga (Kakiga) fled to the north, trying to regroup so he could come back and fight. The departure of Kakiga left a big wound to the state of Bumbogo. Because Kakiga fled with the royal drum Kamuhagama, Kirima could never claim to be King. The newly established Kingdom was taken over by sympathizers of the Tutsi king Kirima. But then came the first of two invasions of Banyoro (People of Bunyoro) under Kirima's successor Mukobanya.

In the Rwandan history, Kirima is known as Cyirima I Rugwe. In contrast to the classic chronology, modern historians dispute that his successor, Kigeri I Mukobanya, was his son. They rather insist that he was son of the king of Bugesera, a kingdom located south of Kigali ruled by the clan of Abahondogo. Cyirima stole his wife, and it is assumed that she was already pregnant with Mukobanya. Already at the reign of Cyirima, Mukobanya became a great warrior because he could annex Bumbogo, Buriza, and Rukoma among others, expanding the Rwandan territory from a few hills to a large territory. During his own reign, he inflicted a strong defeat to the mighty Banyoro army, and it had to withdraw from Rwanda. They attacked again during the reign of his successor and defeated him. Mukobanya was the first true expansionist king of Rwanda, but his acceptance as king seems to have been a result of his bravery.

In the mid-eighteenth century, the Rwandan kingdom became far more centralized. It expanded continuously, reaching the shores of Lake Kivu. This expansion was a combination of military conquest with a migration of Rwandan populations spreading their agricultural techniques and social organization. All of these factors extended the political control of the Rwandan king, the Mwami. Once this was established, camps of warriors were established along vulnerable borders to prevent incursions. Only against other well developed kingdoms such as Gisaka, Bugesera and Burundi was expansion carried out primarily by force of arms.

Under the Tutsi monarchy, the economic imbalance between the Hutus and the Tutsis crystallized, a complex political imbalance emerged as the Tutsis formed into a hierarchy dominated by a Mwami or 'king'. The King was treated as a semi-divine being, responsible for making the country prosper. He adopted the sacred drum Kalinga as the symbol of the King. He also hung the genitals of conquered enemies or rebels on Kalinga. This treatment will later on define the relationship between the Tutsi, the Hutu and the Twa peoples. Originally, the Hutus were among the nobility. They made up 82–85% of the population, and were mostly rich and simple. But later on they were made to live a poor peasant life. With the centralization of the political power, the Tutsis took over the show, monopolized all privileges of the kings, and came to be the ones called the Mwamis. Before the 19th century, the Tutsis held real military power, while the Hutus possessed supernatural power.

The Tutsi monarchy was paralysed by the colonisation through Germany followed by Belgium. It was ended by Grégoire Kayibanda shortly before Rwanda's independence. He founded a political party known as MDR-Parmehutu (Mouvement Démocratique Republicain Parmehutu; French for: "Parmehutu Democratic Republican Movement"). Kayibanda democratically overthrew the Tutsi monarchy of Mwami Kigeri V in 1961, and appointed a government of Hutus. After independence, in July 1962, Kayibanda became the first president of Rwanda. In the general elections of October 1963, MDR Parmehutu won all seats in Parliament. In the coup of July 1973, Kayibanda was ousted by Major General Juvénal Habyarimana, and the Parmehutu party was dissolved. Habyarimana was a Hutu from the clan of Abungura (Abahitira). It is said that his father migrated to Rwanda from the Bakiga of southern Uganda. He installed himself in the northwest part of Rwanda, where Habyarimana was born and raised. Habyarimana was killed by a criminal squad (has to be determined by a court of justice), who fired missiles at his plane which triggered the genocide. President Paul Kagame was accused by France of this crime. Kagame is a Tutsi who grew up in Uganda as a refugee. He is from the Abega clan, which accounted for many queen mothers in the Abanyiginya dynasty of Rwanda.

Getting back to the Bakiga, it is now clear that Kakiga was responsible for the formation of the Kiga Kingdom, its clans and sub-clans, and all the direct descents of his children. Each clan was identified by a totem and also by what they were forbidden from eating. For example, the Ba-Mungwe's totem was the bushbuck and they were prohibited from hunting it for food. All these measures were intended for the protection, sustenance, and well-being of the clans as they were not competing for the same food. There are many clans and sub-clans in the Kiga tribe, but the major ones are: Ba-Mungura (the Royal Clan in which the Mukama was supposed to be born), Ba-Musigi (the clan that was supposed to keep the defence of the King or the Mukama), Ba-Mungwe, Ba-Kinyagiro, Ba-Mugiri, Ba-Muhutu, Ba-Mugera, and Ba-Mugyesera, Ba-Mugyeyo. Each of these clans has sub-clans.
 
The Abukuru b-ekika was a committee of elders chosen by the clan to issue rules and administer justice. If a case was particularly serious and involved more than one clan, the cases would be heard publicly. An Omukuru, ideally a wise elder who knew the customs and traditions of his people, and who could be trusted to give fair advice and justice, was elected to preside over this expanded court.

Kakiga, the son of Mbogo from the state of Bumbogo and of the Abahitira (Abungura) clan, made his move towards the west and settled in the forests of Kagarama, the mountains of the present border of Rwanda and Uganda in Kigezi District. In around 1700, Kakiga established his own community and wished to initiate a new Kingdom, but wanted to go back to fight the Nyoro invaders first. Kakiga found out that the new land was very fertile and had good grass for the cattle. Together with his friends, they made a deal to stay. These became a new group of people called the Abakiga or Bakiga.

As time went on, the population grew and Kakiga wanted to expand his localities. He started sending groups to search and conquer. He sent the first group towards the east in the parts of Karweru, where the group of the Abasigi was supposed to conquer. This group was under the leadership of Rwandeme. This was believed to be the strongest group that was to fight the forces of Ankore. Unfortunately, Rwandeme lost the Royal Drum. Since the Kingdom could not stand without a drum, Rwandeme never dared to return to Kagarama. He remained in the mountains of Karweru and his group intermarried with the Ankore people. This explains why most of the Abasigi are found in these parts of the region. It also gives the reason to why there are many different accents, intonations, and spellings in the Rukiga language.

Out of anger at his father Mbogo, Kakiga ordered obligatory circumcision of all male children. Many did not support this, but he maintained that every Mungura shall have to be circumcised, and that Kings must be circumcised, too. This is why the Abungura is the only clan in the entire Kiga tribe that undergoes circumcision. The circumcision was to be taken at the eleventh (11th) year. The rest of the Bakiga do not circumcise under cultural obligation. But these days, some take it for other reasons, but not because they have to. Kakiga also left the Kiga legacy of the system of naming. The Kiga people take the family name after their grandfather, or after their father has died. That is why, it is very hard to trace the lineage of the Bakiga through family names. But among different clans, they still hold the norm of the founding father. For instance, Mbogo could be the son of Rwambogo. But in like a seventh generation, Mubangizi could be the son of Mubanga. All in all, the same names would be revolving around in the same family. But nowadays, many educated Bakiga find it useful to use their parents’ names, even if they are still alive.  Even the Royal clan does it. This separation and rebellion will mark the complexity of the Kiga community, letting it look as though the community never had a political system.

The major factors that led to the failure of the formation of the Kiga kingdom to the fullest were, mostly, a lack of trust and fear of Kakiga, the lack of a military strong enough for a successful invasion, the sudden prosperity and discovery of fertile lands. Kakiga, though he lost the royal drum, continued to be strong. He sent another group to attack further in the north. This was the group of the Abaromba and the Abahimba. These diffused to most parts of Muko, Rubanda, and Kihihi. Other groups went to Kakore and Mparo, and proceeded to Nyakishenyi and Nyarushanje.  We still find a mixture of Ankore and Kinyarwanda accents and intonations in these areas. Kakiga attempted to make another drum, but he could not get testicles of brave enemies to decorate it. He only made declarations that his sons and daughters should not marry any foreigner, because he believed that the pure King should be from Rwanda.

He made his shield out of cattle skin. He promoted agriculture and his tools were mainly the panga, the spear, and the hoe. He enjoyed wrestling, dancing, hunting and keeping cattle. The most common figures of the few known Bungura Royals include: Muhanga (Mubanga), Rwabutare, Kamboji, Kabogo, Katumba, Katamujuna, Kahigyi, Bakunzi, Mbogo, Rwakasole, Mungura, Rwambogo. The Abungura, though few as they may be, are still the recognized Royal Clan of the Kiga Tribe and most of them live in outskirts of Kabale Town, and still enjoy their hereditary wealth. They are not wealthy in the strict sense of the word. They are renowned for their love for research and education. The Bungura were also known for their tough leadership, and at times, they are referred to as arrogant, and aggressive.

There has been a variety of experiences in the life of the Bakiga, such as interactions with other Kingdoms, religions, and many other cultures. The Bakiga are very hospitable and enjoy the privilege of having a mixed language. Rukiga, as a language, is a combination of the influence of the accents and alphabets from Rwanda, Ankore, Toro, Bufumbira, and Swahili.

Before the Bakiga were educated about Islam and Christianity, they believed in one God. The Bakiga understood God as creator who is neither male or female, known as Ruhanga. God is also known through many attributes. As the supreme elder and the ruler of the universe, he is called Mukama. When associated with the power of the sun, he is Kazooba-Nyamuhanga. In his aspect as the one who makes things grow, he is called Biheeko. Many Bakiga with the influence of Christianity adopted 'theo-phoric' names.

While the Bakiga would later be classified as Hutu, originally they considered themselves an entirely separate people.  In modern Rwanda, the Hutus of southern Rwanda are called Banyanduga, while the Hutus in the northern Rwanda are collectively referred to as Bakiga.

Colonial period

Many Bakiga still lived in Rwanda at the time of European colonization. An Anglo-German agreement signed in Brussels on 14 May 1910, modified part of the boundary between British and German territories initially established as the parallel of one degree south latitude by the treaty of 1890. Modified were the sectors between the Congo tripoint and the junction of the Kakitumba and Kagera, comprising the present Rwanda-Uganda boundary, and between the junction and the second crossing of the parallel of one degree south latitude by the Kagera, comprising the western segment of the present Tanzania-Uganda boundary. Details of the final delimitation and demarcation of the Rwanda-Uganda boundary between the Congo tripoint of Sabinio and the southwestern branch (Lubirizi) of the Tshinzinga (Muvogero) are given in an Anglo-German Protocol signed at Kamwezi on 30 October 1911. Therefore, many Bakiga became Ugandans by de facto in 1911 when the current international boundaries of Uganda were formally finalized.

The Bakiga communities defended their independence until the collaboration of German colonial forces and the royal troops of the Mwami or Mukama succeeded in incorporating the region into the Rwandan colonial state at the turn of the twentieth century. The region remained a hotbed of discontent against the central authority for many years. One of the strongest influences upon the character of the Bakiga was the anti-centrist cult of Nyabingi.

After the death of the Rwandan King, Kigeri IV Rwabugiri in 1895, one of his wives called Muhumuza fled to the mountains of Kiga and proclaimed an anti-colonial rebellion in 1911. She was captured the same year and her resistance taken up by Ndungutse, generally recognized as the son of Muhumuza and Rwabugiri. Ndungutse was killed, though sporadic rebellions sprang up until the advent of Belgian rule after World War I. The conditions for these rebellions were created by the system of forced labor tribute (ubareetwa) imposed on the Bakiga by their new colonial masters. P.T.W. Baxter noted that, "The proud boast of the Kiga is that they were never, as a people, subjugated by either Tutsi or Hima." However, this resistance was, paradoxically, in large part led or inspired by disaffected members of the Tutsi elite.

The Bakiga became one of two major forces, along with the hill-level tensions of Hutu peasants and Tutsi chiefs, in the formation of "Social Revolution" of 1959.  In the pre-colonial system, land usage was controlled by chiefs who owned land (bakonde) or controlled access to it (bagererwa). With the onset of colonial rule, these chiefs were technically replaced by southern Tutsi and Bakiga who agreed to work for them. However, the old order was never entirely erased, resulting in tensions between the two.  While the older bakonde yearned for a return to their old status, younger generations of bakonde were able to merge their claims into that of the anti-colonial/Tutsi revolutionary movement.

Modern life 

When the British came to nowadays Kabale in 1908, they found farmers and hunters living without any central authority, as they preferred to exist in this way, not wanting to be organized in manner that the other Rwanda groups were. There was frequent fighting, plunder and raids from all sides, of recent epidemics, famines, and a locust invasion had challenged the society. There were very many clans and so, the Europeans applied the concept of a tribe to the clans, with little grounds for it because the Bakiga are a myriad of very distinct clan groups. Though the ruling class of the Abahitira existed and still exists today (Abungura had collapsed), at that time, the groups were not united in any way and the language they were speaking was a dialectical variation of Runyankore, Kinyarwanda, Kihororo and some kind of Kihaya. The term "Bakiga" could be translated from Kinyarwanda as "Highlanders", and it was in the beginning most frequently used by the Royal clan of the Abungura, though at later time, they were mostly referred to by the outsiders, and rarely did the people themselves recognise it as a whole tribe. Over time it has become a part of local consciousness and today, it is widely known as the people of the hills. However, they did not start out as a single distinct tribe as are other large tribal groups in the region.
Bakiga are very hardworking and warrior type. The warrior nature of the Bakiga made it difficult for colonisers to penetrate their culture. The time the colonialists came to Kigezi, they could not influence any single person since they had not yet formed a single body of kingdom, because, it was still underway.

As sporadic attempts of Bakiga's violent resistance to foreign rule often formed around religious cults, entire traditional religion had to go underground to please the administration. Indigenous people initially thought that a convert to Christianity would lose the reasoning capacity and become an idiot. They equated Christianity with colonialism, and when they refused one, they felt obliged to reject the other - or to accept both, if they accepted one.

A glance of the Bakiga 40 years after Uganda's independence would give an impression of thoroughly prevailing European influences. The Bakiga are majority Christian (Muslims are few) and starkly divided into Catholics and Protestants, a division which strongly polarizes communities. One's religion can determine professional prospects and religious preferences heavily influence local political elections.

The Bakiga are very developmental. They love new things and enjoy life. In ancient times they had one thing to admire from colonists, their way of life. Most of the Bakiga dream of having a good life, and decent living. The European way was a perfect image for them. Remember that the state of denial of kingship would still come up in trying to imitate the high life. So for the Bakiga, a European-style home, imported objects are admired, and locals dress in a Western way. As in most of Uganda, people are extremely concerned about clothing. To "look smart" is a priority for anyone who can afford it.

The elaborate, among the older generation, traditional weddings of the Bakiga were being neglected by anyone who could afford a Western-looking ceremony. Clothes were borrowed, music equipment and generators brought to the area, every possible thing done to imitate foreign customs. However of recent, most youth are going back to their cultural ways. Traditional wedding ceremonies are being held more often than before, everyone comes dressed in the Kikiga - Kinyakore wear, as the traditional ceremonies are carried out.

It should also be noted that Bakiga regardless of where they are, have a strong solidarity more so among the youth.

At the meetings of district councils, English is used although everybody is a Mukiga, though it is the problem of the entire country. Parents who know English well, sometimes resort to speaking it with their children. Those who use English are supposed to be educated and successful.

Festo Karwemera, a respected elder from Kabale, offers this general comment: "Accepting the culture of the West is a result of the inferiority complex due to ignorance emanating from the fact that they are the ones introducing civilisation in this land and we tend to assume that everything they do is the best. Their way of living is clean and attractive hence positive because nobody takes trouble to find out how best we can modernise our culture in our own way."

Notable people
Notable people of Kiga origin include:
 

 Kwatsi Alibaruho, the first African-American Flight Director for the National Aeronautics and Space Administration.
 David Bahati, Ugandan Politician, MP for Ndorwa East, who proposed legislation that would have Ugandans of non-heterosexual orientation, as well as those who fail to report them to the authorities, hanged.
 Henry Banyenzaki, Ugandan politician, MP for Rubanda West and Minister for Economic Monitoring.
 Mondo Kagonyera, Ugandan politician, veterinarian, academic, and university administrator. Former chancellor of Makerere University.
 Anne Kansiime, Ugandan comedienne, actress, and entertainer
 George Kanyeihamba, former Justice of the Supreme Court of Uganda
 Festo Kivengere, former Anglican Bishop and critic of dictator Idi Amin's regime. His tomb at St Peter's cathedral, Rugarama in Kabale District is revered by many Anglican Kiga people.
 Amama Mbabazi, former Ugandan Prime Minister and current Secretary General of the ruling National Resistance Movement party, formerly Security Minister and State Minister for Defence.
 Hope Mwesigye, Ugandan politician, former Ugandan Minister of Agriculture.
 Ruhakana Rugunda, former Ugandan Permanent Representative to the United Nations and first Ugandan Chairman of the UN Security Council, former Minister of Health, currently Prime Minister.
 Rutamirika, former Ugandan actor, playwright, producer and singer-songwriter
 Emmanuel Tumusiime-Mutebile, economist and banker, current Governor of the Central Bank of Uganda

References

Relevant literature
Rutanga, Murindwa and Fr Vincent Kanyonza. 2021. Epistemology and Politics in Proverbial Names in the Pre-Colonial Great Lakes Region. Francis B. Nyamnjoh, Patrick Nwosu, Hassan M. Yosimbom, eds. Being and Becoming African as a Permanent Work in Progress: Inspiration from Chinua Achebe's Proverbs pp. 379–412. Langaa Research and Publishing Common Initiative Group.

Ethnic groups in Rwanda
Ethnic groups in Uganda